The Sakalava are an ethnic group of Madagascar. They are found on the western and northwest region of the island, in a band along the coast. The Sakalava are one of the smaller ethnic groups, constituting about 6.2 percent of the total population, that is over 1,210,000 in 2014. Their name means "people of the long valleys." They occupy the western edge of the island from Toliara in the south to the Sambirano River in the north.

Ethnic identity
The Sakalava denominate a number of smaller ethnic groups that once comprised an empire, rather than an ethnic group in its own right. The origin of the word Sakalava itself is still subject to controversy, as well as its actual meaning. The most common explanation is the modern Malagasy translation of Sakalava meaning long ravines, denoting the relatively flat nature of the land in western Madagascar.  Another theory is that the word is possibly from the Arabic saqaliba, which is in turn derived from Late Latin sclavus, meaning slave.

History

Sakalavas are considered to be a mix of Austronesians and Bantu peoples. Austronesian people started settling in Madagascar between 400 and 900 CE. They arrived by boats and were from various southeast Asian and Oceanian groups. The earliest confirmed settlements, on Nosy Mangabe and in the Mananara Valley, date to the eighth century. Bantu-speaking farmers, moving from Central and East Africa, arrived in Madagascar in the ninth century. According to Gwyn Campbell, "the most accurate genetic data to date indicates that the founding settlement, on the northwest coast, comprised a maximum of 20 households, totalling [sic] around 500 people, either genetically mixed, or half Austronesian and half African." Later, Africans of the Swahili, Arab and Indian and Tamil traders came to the island's northern regions. Enslaved people from mainland Africa were brought to the island in increasing numbers between the 15th and the 18th centuries, particularly to the region where Sakalava people now live. This influx of diverse people led to various Malagasy sub-ethnicities in the mid-2nd millennium. The Portuguese traders were the first Europeans to arrive in the 15th century, followed by other European powers.

The founder of Sakalava legacy was Andriamisara. His descendant Andriandahifotsy ("the White Prince"), after 1610, then extended his authority northwards, past the Mangoky River, aided by weapons obtained in exchange for slave trading. His two sons, Andriamanetiarivo and Andriamandisoarivo (also known as Tsimanatona) extended gains further up to the Tsongay region (now Mahajanga).

The chiefs of the different coastal settlements on the island began to extend their power to control trade. The first significant Sakalava kingdoms were formed about the 1650s. They dominated the western of northwestern regions of Madagascar during the 1700s. The Sakalava chiefdoms of the Menabe, centred in what was then known as Andakabe, now the town of Morondava, were principal among them. The influence of the Sakalava extended across what is now the provinces of Antsiranana, Mahajanga and Toliara. The Sakalava kingdom reached its peak geographic spread between 1730-1760, under King Andrianinevenarivo.

According to local tradition, the founders of the Sakalava kingdom were Maroseraña (or Maroseranana, "those who owned many ports") princes, from the Fiherenana (now Toliara). They may also be descended from the Zafiraminia (sons of Ramini) clans from the southwestern part of the island, possibly from Arab origin. The demand for slaves by first Omani Arabs who controlled the Zanzibar slave trade, and later European slave-traders, led to slave raiding operations and exercise of control on the major ports on the north and northwest region of Madagascar. Initially the Arabs exclusively supplied weapons to the Sakalava in exchange for slaves. These slaves were obtained from slave raids to Comoros and other coastal settlements of Madagascar, as well as from merchant ships arriving from the Swahili coast of Africa. The Sakalava kingdom quickly subjugated the neighbouring territories in the Mahafaly area, starting with the southern ones.

The Merina oral histories and documents in Comoros mention series of annual expeditions by Sakalava slave raiders against their villages through the end of the 18th century. These expeditions were aided by guns obtained from the Arabs, a weapon that both Comoros and Merina people lacked. The largest and one of the most favored ports for slave trade on Madagascar was the Sakalava coastal town of Mahajanga. The Sakalava had a monopoly on slave trade in Madagascar till the end of the 18th century. Although smaller by population, their weapons permitted them wide reach and power, allowing them to force other more populous ethnic groups to pay tribute to them in the eighteenth century.

The Merina king Radama I bought guns in late 18th century, launched a war with the Sakalava, which ended the hegemony of the Sakalava kingdom and their slave raids. The Merina then reversed the historical enslavement their people had faced, and began supplying slaves. Though the Merina were never to annex the two last Sakalava strongholds of Menabe and Boina (Mahajanga), the Sakalava never again posed a threat to the central highlands, which remained under Merina control until the French colonization of the island, a century later, in 1896.

Demographics

The historical formation process of the Sakalava kingdom explains the great diversity among its constituents, who continue to perpetuate distinctive regional customs, both culturally and linguistically. About the latter, the only real unifying factor of the different Sakalava dialects is their common membership to the western subgroup of Madagascar languages with strong influence from Africa, which distinguishes them from central and East coast languages of the island, which are primarily Austronesian (Malayo-Polynesian) languages.

The Sakalava people are widely distributed, over about 128,000 square kilometers in a band along the coast from Onilahy River in the southwest to Nosy Be in the north. These people also feature the zebu cattle herds similar to those found in Africa, which are less common in other regions and interior of the island.

Religion
The traditional religion of the Sakalava people, called Fomba Gasy, was centered around royal ancestor worship, aided by the noble dady lineage who preserved the remains of the deceased rulers. The dady priests would conduct a ceremony called Tromba, whereby they divined the spirits of the dead ancestors and communicated their words back to the Sakalava people.

Islam arrived among the Sakalava people with the Arab traders. It was adopted by the rulers of the Sakalava people in the eighteenth century, in order to gain the military support of the Omani and Zanzibar Sultanates, as the influence of Merina people and the European traders increased. Significant percentage of the Sakalava converted to Islam during the reign of Andriantsoly, while continuing their traditional religious practices such as spirit worship.

Christianity arrived among the Sakalava people with European traders. In early 19th century, the Sakalava sought military support of the European colonial powers in order to contain the reach of the Merina kingdom. The French military power led by Captain Passot arrived on Sakalava ports, accompanied with Jesuit and Catholic Christian missionaries. The island town of Nosy Be became their mission post, and by early 20th century, numerous Catholic churches had been built in the Sakalava region. Protestantism attempted to reach the Sakalava, but the animosity of Muslim Sakalava royalty for the Merina nobility who were already Protestants, as well as the refusal of Sakalava to abandon their traditional practices such as royalty spirit worship, particularly their Tromba-tradition, has made Sakalava continue with either Islam or Catholicism.

Society and culture
Tromba has been a historic feature of the Sakalava people, and has centered around ceremonies and processions for the spirits of their deceased royalty. The procession is more than a religious event, it has historically been a form of community celebration and identity affirming festival. Tromba is also found among other ethnic groups in other parts of Madagascar, but with Sakalava it has had a long association and support of the royal dynasties, which mutually perpetuated the practice and associated importance.

Social stratification
The Sakalava society became socially stratified like many other ethnic groups with the start of the slavery. The Sakalava stratification system was hierarchical based on presumed purity of each stratum. In the Sakalava kingdom, the strata included the Ampanzaka, or the royal caste, and the Makoa, or the term for the descendants of African slaves.

Livelihood
The Sakalava have been pastoralists with large zebu cattle herds, traditionally allowed to graze freely over the grasslands in their northwest region. Unlike the Merina and Betsileo people of the interior who became highly productive rice farmers, the coastal and valley region Sakalava have historically had limited agriculture. However, in contemporary Madagascar, migrants have expanded farms and agriculture into the northwestern provinces.

Notable Sakalava
 Jaojoby, singer known as the King of Salegy, is a Malagasy who came from Sakalava ethnicity.

See also
Fitampoha

References

Bibliography

 Portions of this article were translated from :fr:Sakalava
  
   
 
 

 
Slavery in Africa